The Roots N Blues Festival, previously the Roots N Blues N BBQ Festival, is an annual music festival that takes place in Stephens Lake Park in Columbia, Missouri. The festival features international, national, regional and local artists, both established and emerging, from the genres of roots, blues, gospel, country, folk, bluegrass, rock and soul. The Roots N Blues Festival is a three-day event that is typically held during the last weekend of September. 

The festival includes over 30 live music performances on two stages, food and beverage vendors, craft vendors, a Ferris wheel and art installations. The festival also hosts a half marathon and 10k race and a gospel celebration during the festival weekend. The festival is organized by Thumper Entertainment, which also manages the non-profit Roots N Blues Foundation in support of Blues in the Schools, a youth music education program.

History 
The Roots N Blues N BBQ Festival began in 2007 as a free promotional event celebrating the 150-year birthday of Boone County National Bank (now Central Bank of Boone County) on the streets of downtown Columbia, Missouri. The 2007 Roots N Blues N BBQ Festival was organized by advertising agency Woodruff Sweitzer with the help of Richard King, then-owner of The Blue Note. The City of Columbia shut down ten city blocks in downtown Columbia for the festival, which drew a crowd of around 70,000.

In 2007, the Blues in the Schools program was formed by King and local musician and educator TJ Wheeler. The program brings music and cultural education to elementary, middle school and high school students across mid-Missouri. In 2013, the Roots N Blues Foundation was formed to manage the program.

In 2008, Thumper Entertainment was established and took over organization and operation of the festival. Woodruff Sweitzer and King continued ownership of the festival and Thumper Entertainment.  

In 2013, the festival was moved to Stephens Lake Park. After the change of location, the festival saw a decline in attendance, from 52,000 in the year prior to just over 23,000. The drop in attendance was likely due to an elimination of free attendance areas.

In 2014, the addition of a green vendor program marked a move toward sustainability. A set of guidelines for food and craft vendors, which includes replacing styrofoam and plastic plates and utensils with biodegradable alternatives, recycling fry oil and composting food scraps, intends to help minimize the festival's ecological footprint.

Headliners By Year

2007 (September 7–8) 
 Tab Benoit
 Taj Mahal
 Blind Boys of Alabama
 Jerry Douglas Band
 Big Smith
 Deke Dickerson

2008 (October 3–4) 
 Tab Benoit 
 Buddy Guy 
 Roy C
 Dale Watson 
 James Hand 
 Del McCoury Band

2009 (September 9–10) 
 Blind Boys of Alabama 
 Dan Tyminski 
 Black Joe Lewis & The Honey Bears
 Booker T.
 The Itals 
 The SteelDrivers

2010 (October 1–2) 
 Derek Trucks & Susan Tedeschi 
 Tab Benoit 
 Del McCoury Band 
 Anders Osborne 
 Trampled Under Foot

2011 (September 9–10) 
 Fitz and the Tantrums 
 Los Lobos 
 Taj Mahal 
 Ana Popovic 
 Robert Randolph and the Family Band

2012 (September 21–22) 
 Al Green 
 Edward Sharpe & The Magnetic Zeros 
 Joe Lovano Us Five with Esperanza Spalding, James Weidman, Otis Brown III, & Matt Wilson 
 Wanda Jackson 
 Marty Stuart & His Fabulous Superlatives
 Del McCoury Band

2013 (September 20–22) 
 The Black Crowes 
 Blues Traveler 
 Jimmy Cliff 
 John Hiatt 
 Steve Earle

2014 (September 26–28) 
 The Avett Brothers 
 John Prine 
 Rosanne Cash 
 Amos Lee 
 Trampled by Turtles 
 Los Lobos 
 Jason Isbell 
 St. Paul & The Broken Bones

2015 (September 25–27) 
 Dwight Yoakam 
 Brandi Carlile 
 NEEDTOBREATHE 
 Buddy Guy 
 Dr. John 
 The Word featuring Robert Randolph, John Medeski, & North Mississippi Allstars 
 Lucinda Williams 
 Punch Brothers 
 G. Love & Special Sauce

2016 (September 30 – October 2) 
 The Avett Brothers 
 Grace Potter 
 Jason Isbell 
 Nathaniel Rateliff & The Night Sweats 
 Ben Folds 
 St. Paul & The Broken Bones

2017 (September 29 – October 1) 
 Ryan Adams 
 Leon Bridges 
 Gary Clark Jr. 
 John Prine 
 Emmylou Harris 
 Band of Horses 
 Booker T's Stax Revue

2020 
The 2020 Festival was canceled due to the Covid-19 Pandemic.

See also
University of Missouri School of Music

References

External links
Roots N Blues Foundation

Music festivals established in 2007
2007 establishments in Missouri
Tourist attractions in Columbia, Missouri
Blues festivals in the United States
Blues festivals in North America
bluegrass festivals
Country music festivals in the United States
Music festivals in Columbia, Missouri
Music venues in Columbia, Missouri